Harry Ferdinand Olson (December 28, 1901 – April 1, 1982) was a prominent engineer at RCA Victor and a pioneer in the field of 20th century acoustical engineering.

Biography
Harry F. Olson was born in Mount Pleasant, Iowa, to Swedish immigrant parents. Technically inclined from an early age, he built and flew model airplanes, constructed a steam engine and invented a wood-fired boiler that drove a 100-volt DC generator. Olson designed and built an amateur radio transmitter, gaining enough proficiency to be granted an operator's license. Olson went on to earn a bachelor's degree in electrical engineering from the University of Iowa then continued to earn a master's degree with a thesis on acoustic wave filters in solids and a doctorate in physics, working with polarization of resonance radiation in mercury. Immediately after completing his course of study in 1928, Olson moved to New Jersey to work for RCA Laboratories. Olson would remain at RCA for almost four decades.

Olson had a continuing interest in music, acoustics, and sound reproduction, and, by 1934, he was placed in charge of acoustical research at RCA. At RCA, Olson worked on a wide range of projects, which included developing microphones for the broadcasting and motion picture industries, improving loudspeakers, and making significant contributions to magnetic tape recording. Like many engineers of the World War II generation, Olson also made significant contributions to military technology as well, particularly to the fields of underwater sound and anti-submarine warfare. After the war Olson, along with Herbert Belar, developed the first modern electronic synthesizer. Equipped with electron tubes, the Mark II Sound Synthesizer was used to compose music, which was recorded and sold to the public.

A prolific inventor and engineer, Olson was awarded more than 100 patents for the various types of microphones (including the widely used 44- and 77-series), cardioid (directional) microphones, loudspeaker baffles, air-suspension loudspeakers, isobaric loudspeakers, early video recording equipment, audio recording equipment, phonograph pickups, underwater sound equipment, noise reduction, sound technology in motion-pictures, and public-address systems he developed. He also authored 135 articles and ten books including an interdisciplinary text charting the dynamical analogies between electrical, acoustical and mechanical systems. In 1949, Olson was honored by being the first recipient of the Audio Engineering Society's John H. Potts Memorial Award, an award program which was later renamed the gold medal. In 1953-4 Olson served as president of the Acoustical Society of America, which awarded him the very first Silver Medal in Engineering Acoustics in 1974 and the Gold Medal in 1981.  He won the IEEE Lamme Medal in 1970, was elected to the National Academy of Sciences in 1959, and was the recipient of many honorary degrees during his lifetime.

Olson retired from RCA in 1967, continuing as a consultant for RCA Laboratories.

High Fidelity Demonstration

Shortly after World War II, Dr. Olson conducted an experiment, now considered a classic, to determine the preferred bandwidth for the reproduction of music. Previous experimenters had found that listeners seemed to prefer a high-frequency cutoff of 5000 Hz for reproduced music. Dr. Olson suspected that this was likely due to imperfections in the sound, especially in the higher frequencies, as reproduced by equipment in common use at the time.  These imperfections included clicks and pops (from 78 rpm recordings), added noise (from AM radio broadcast static), hiss and harmonic distortion (from amplifier circuits), and non linear frequency response from primitive loudspeaker designs. If the sound was free of these problems, he reasoned, listeners would prefer full frequency reproduction.

In his experiment, he set up a room which was divided diagonally by a visually opaque but acoustically transparent screen. The screen incorporated a concealed low-pass acoustical filter having an upper frequency cutoff of 5000 Hz.  This filter could be opened or closed, allowing either the full range of frequencies to pass or the range only below 5000 Hz. At first, a small orchestra sat and performed on one side of the screen, while a group of test subjects sat on the other and listened.  The listeners were asked to select their preference between two conditions: full bandwidth or restricted bandwidth. There was overwhelming preference in favor of the full bandwidth.  Next, the orchestra was replaced with a sound-reproduction system with loudspeakers positioned behind the screen instead. When the sound system was free of distortion, the listeners preferred the full bandwidth. But when he introduced small amounts of nonlinear distortion, the subjects preferred a restricted bandwidth, thus demonstrating clearly the importance of high quality in audio systems.

As a result of this experiment and the work of others, such as Avery Fisher and later Edgar Villchur, high fidelity sound recording, transmission, and reproduction equipment saw increased investment, development, and public acceptance in the following decades.  The design and manufacture of everything from microphones, to tape recorders, vinyl records, amplifiers, and loudspeakers were impacted.

Influence on High-Quality Modern PA Systems
The Grateful Dead's early sound engineering team, led by Owsley Stanley and Dan Healy, considered Harry Olwson's 1957 book "Acoustical Engineering" the Dead's "bible" on building the Wall of Sound (Grateful Dead), the first touring sound system that allowed a band to actually hear themselves and have the audience hear what the band was hearing on stage. The band made copies of the book for all of the Dead's sound crew.

The Wall of Sound influenced all modern high-quality PA systems for live music.

Personal life

Harry F. Olson was born in Mt. Pleasant, Iowa, on December 18, 1901.  He was the first of two children.  His parents were Swedish immigrants.

Olson married Lorene Johnson of Morris, Illinois in 1935. Both his mother and his wife were talented amateur artists — Lorene's paintings were displayed in Olson's RCA office for many years. Olson died at Princeton Medical Center in Princeton, New Jersey on April 1, 1982, at the age of 80.

Awards and honors

Patents

References

External links
Olson biography
National Academy of Sciences. Harry F. Olson, 1901-1982: A Biographical Memoir by Cyril M. Harris
 

American acoustical engineers
1901 births
1982 deaths
American people of Swedish descent
Members of the United States National Academy of Sciences
ASA Gold Medal recipients
IEEE Lamme Medal recipients
20th-century American inventors
Engineers from Iowa
Fellows of the American Physical Society